Dymba is a genus of moths of the family Noctuidae. Its only species, Dymba coryphata, is found in Panama. Both the genus and species were first described by Harrison Gray Dyar Jr. in 1914.

References

Acontiinae
Monotypic moth genera